Tennis  at the 2022 European Youth Summer Olympic Festival will be held at the Sports Park Tennis in Banská Bystrica, Slovakia from 25 to 30 July 2022.

Medal table

Medalists

Participating nations
A total of 65 athletes from 34 nations competed in tennis at the 2022 European Youth Summer Olympic Festival:

 (2)
 (2)
 (2)
 (1)
 (2)
 (2)
 (2)
 (2)
 (2)
 (2)
 (2)
 (2)
 (2)
 (2)
 (2)
 (1)
 (2)
 (2)
 (2)
 (2)
 (2)
 (2)
 (2)
 (2)
 (2)
 (2)
 (2)
 (1)
 (2)
 (2)
 (2)
 (2)
 (2)
 (2)

References

European Youth Summer Olympic Festival
2022 European Youth Summer Olympic Festival
Tennis tournaments in Slovakia
2022